Wang Tong (born 12 February 1993) is a Chinese footballer who currently plays for Shandong Taishan in the Chinese Super League.

Club career
Wang Tong started his football career playing with Shandong Luneng's youth academy where he impressed then manager Branko Ivanković during many training sessions. He was then included into the first team when he made his debut for the club on 31 October 2010 in a 2-0 win against Changsha Ginde. While he would have limited playing time throughout the season he was part of the squad that won the 2010 Chinese Super League title. Wang cemented his place as a regular in the team's backline during the 2012 season and he continued to be a starter for the club in the 2013 season. The following season he would aid the club by winning the 2014 Chinese FA Cup with them. A consistent regular within the team, he would gain his second league title with the club when he was part of the team that won the 2021 Chinese Super League title.

International career
Wang made his debut for the Chinese national team on 5 August 2015 in a 2-0 win against North Korea.

Career statistics

Club statistics
.

International statistics

Honours

Club
Shandong Luneng/ Shandong Taishan
Chinese Super League: 2010, 2021
Chinese FA Cup: 2014, 2020, 2021, 2022
Chinese FA Super Cup: 2015

References

External links
 
 
Player stats at Sohu.com

1993 births
Living people
Footballers from Shenyang
Chinese footballers
Shandong Taishan F.C. players
Chinese Super League players
Association football defenders
China youth international footballers
China international footballers